Mike de Geer (born 28 December 1989 in The Hague) is a Dutch professional footballer who plays for HBS Craeyenhout in the Dutch Topklasse. He formerly played for ADO Den Haag. His father is former football player Boudewijn de Geer, and his great-grandfather was wartime Prime Minister Dirk Jan de Geer.

See also
De Geer

References

External links
 Player profile at Voetbal International

1989 births
Living people
Dutch footballers
ADO Den Haag players
Eredivisie players
Derde Divisie players
Footballers from The Hague
Association football midfielders